Oljga N. Dubovik (born 1935) is a botanist.  Dubovik's works are collection and description of spermatophytes in Russia and Ukraine.

Authority abbreviation

References

Living people
1935 births
20th-century botanists